Volker Duschner (12 October 1945 – 13 June 2022) was a German fencer. He competed at the 1968 and 1972 Summer Olympics.

References

External links
 

1945 births
2022 deaths
German male fencers
Olympic fencers of West Germany
Fencers at the 1968 Summer Olympics
Fencers at the 1972 Summer Olympics
Sportspeople from Munich
20th-century German people